The James A. Rawley Prize is awarded by the American Historical Association (AHA) for the best book in Atlantic history.
The prize is given in memory of James A. Rawley, professor of history emeritus at the University of Nebraska–Lincoln.

See also

 List of history awards

References

American history awards
Political history of the United States